Lira Regional Referral Hospital, commonly known as Lira Hospital, is a hospital in Lira in the Northern Region of Uganda. It is the referral hospital for the districts of Amolatar, Apac, Dokolo, Lira, Kole, and Oyam.

Location

The coordinates of Lira Hospital are: 02°15'06.0"N, 32°54'07.0"E (Latitude:2.251667; Longitude:32.901944)

Overview
Lira Hospital is a public hospital, funded by the Uganda Ministry of Health, and general care in the hospital is free. It is one of the regional referral hospitals in Uganda. The hospital is designated as one of the internship hospitals in Uganda, where graduates of Ugandan medical schools can serve one year of internship under the supervision of qualified specialists and consultants. The bed capacity of the hospital in 2012 was 254. Staff shortage is a concern. In 2012, of the 39 required doctors, the hospital had only 9 doctors.

In September 2017, the hospital commissioned an 8-apartment building to house some of the critically essential staff, so that they can quickly respond to emergencies. Prior to then, all staff lived off-campus, away from the hospital. Construction of the three-story building started in January 2015 and lasted 2 years and eight months, at a cost of USh1.5 billion (approx. US$430,000), fully funded by the Government of Uganda.

See also
Hospitals in Uganda
List of universities in Uganda
Juliet Sekabunga Nalwanga

References

External links
  Lira District Internet Portal
  Committee Observes Shortfalls In Health Care Delivery

Hospitals in Uganda
Hospitals established in 1920
1920 establishments in Uganda
Lira District
Lango sub-region
Northern Region, Uganda